The Inter-American League was a high-level circuit in Minor league baseball that lasted only three months before folding during the 1979 season. 

The league was conceived both as an official Triple-A minor league circuit and member of the National Association of Professional Baseball Leagues. It was composed of six clubs unaffiliated with Major League Baseball farm systems. 

The Inter-American loop was headed by Bobby Maduro, former owner of the Triple-A Havana Sugar Kings and a longtime scout and front-office executive active in Latin American countries and Major League Baseball. 

A 130-game regular season was planned, while the six teams were located in the United States, Panama, Puerto Rico, the Dominican Republic and Venezuela(2). The league featured several well-known MLB veterans, with rosters averaging players between 26-29 years of age.

But the new circuit was barely able to complete half its schedule, fatally wounded by "under-capitalized owners, internecine rivalries among Caribbean baseball powers, tropical monsoons, and unreliable air travel." 

On June 17, 1979, the Panama and Puerto Rico teams disbanded, leaving the league with only four clubs. Thirteen days later, the entire league folded. The Miami Amigos, led by future Major League manager Davey Johnson, were in first place with a 51–21 mark (.708) when the Inter-American League shut down.

List of teams
Caracas Metropolitanos (VEN)
Panama Banqueros (PAN)
Puerto Rico Boricuas (PUR)
Petroleros de Zulia (VEN)
Miami Amigos (USA)
Santo Domingo Azucareros (DOM)

Final standings

References
 Johnson, Lloyd; Wolff, Miles (1997). Encyclopedia of Minor League Baseball. Baseball America.  
 

Defunct baseball leagues
Defunct minor baseball leagues in the United States
Baseball leagues in Florida
Sports leagues established in 1979
Sports leagues disestablished in 1979
1979 establishments in North America
1979 disestablishments in North America